Sarah Lancaster (born February 12, 1980) is an American actress. She is known for her long-running roles as Rachel Meyers in the NBC series Saved by the Bell: The New Class and Ellie Bartowski in the NBC comedy-spy series Chuck, as well as playing Chloe Grefe in Lovers Lane, Madison Kellner on The WB's Everwood, and Marjorie in ABC's TV series What About Brian.

Career
Lancaster  has appeared on Sabrina, the Teenage Witch, Dawson's Creek, That '70s Show, Scrubs, and CSI: Crime Scene Investigation. She also landed two recurring roles: on The WB series Everwood as Ephram's love interest Madison Kellner; and on David E. Kelley's FOX series Boston Public. In 2005 she starred in the TV movie Living With the Enemy. Most notably, she appeared as Ellie Bartowski Woodcomb on the NBC series Chuck from 2007 to 2012.

Lancaster has also worked as a jealous girlfriend-turned-serial killer in the movie Lovers Lane, and as the blackjack dealer, Veronica Harold, on CBS's short-lived Dr. Vegas.

In 2019, Lancaster made her directorial debut with the film Josie & Jack,  based on Kelly Braffet's 2005 novel of the same name.

Personal life
Lancaster is married to attorney Matthew Jacobs. She gave birth to their first son in June 2011, and to their second son in January 2017.

Filmography

Film

Television

References

External links

 Sarah Lancaster Official Twitter 
 
 
 

20th-century American actresses
21st-century American actresses
American child actresses
American film actresses
American television actresses
Actresses from California
Actresses from Kansas
Living people
Actors from Orange County, California
People from Overland Park, Kansas
1980 births